Miodrag Zec (born 4 October 1982) is a Montenegrin former football player.

Honours
Baku
Azerbaijan Cup winner: 2004–05

Mogren
Montenegrin First League champion: 2010–11
Montenegrin Cup winner: 2007–08

Rudar
Montenegrin First League champion: 2009–10
Montenegrin Cup Winner: 2009–10

External links
 

1982 births
Living people
Sportspeople from Cetinje
Association football forwards
Serbia and Montenegro footballers
Montenegrin footballers
OFK Petrovac players
FK Bokelj players
FK Mogren players
FC Spartak Vladikavkaz players
FC Baku players
FC Baltika Kaliningrad players
FK Budućnost Podgorica players
FK Rudar Pljevlja players
KF Tirana players
Second League of Serbia and Montenegro players
Russian Premier League players
Azerbaijan Premier League players
Russian First League players
Montenegrin First League players
Kategoria Superiore players
Serbia and Montenegro expatriate footballers
Expatriate footballers in Russia
Serbia and Montenegro expatriate sportspeople in Russia
Expatriate footballers in Azerbaijan
Serbia and Montenegro expatriate sportspeople in Azerbaijan
Montenegrin expatriate footballers
Expatriate footballers in Albania
Montenegrin expatriate sportspeople in Albania